Kuruvikkarambai is a village in Peravurani Taluk in the Thanjavur District of Tamil Nadu State, India. It is located 68 km south of the district headquarters in Thanjavur, 5 km from Sethubavachatram, and 383 km from the state capital, Chennai.

Here,Farming is the main resources of this place.Coconut tree surrounding are really good to see this place pleasantly.

Geography 
Kuruvikkarambai is surrounded by Peravurani Taluk, Pattukkottai Taluk, and Karambakudi Taluk to the north, and Arantangi Taluk to the west. It's 5 km near to Bay of Bengal.

Notable people 
 The Tamil movie lyricist 'Kuruvikkarambai' Shanmugam is a native of this village.

Villages in Thanjavur district